Santos Futebol Clube is a football club based in Santos, that competes in the Campeonato Paulista, São Paulo's state league, and the Campeonato Brasileiro Série A or Brasileirão, Brazil's national league. The club was founded in 1912 by the initiative of three sports enthusiasts from Santos by the names of Raimundo Marques, Mário Ferraz de Campos, and Argemiro de Souza Júnior, and played its first friendly match on June 23, 1912. Initially Santos played against other local clubs in the city and state championships, but in 1959 the club became one of the founding members of the Taça Brasil, Brazil's first truly national league. As of 2010, Santos is one of only five clubs never to have been relegated from the top level of Brazilian football, the others being São Paulo, Flamengo, Internacional and Cruzeiro.

Santos enjoyed a successful start in the Brasileirão, finishing runners-up in the competition's first season. In the period from 1956 to 1974, the "Peixe" team won the Brasileirão six times, including a record-consecutive five titles from 1961 to 1965, and the Campeonato Paulista 11 times. The club did not win the league again until 2002. In 1978 Santos had finished 23rd, which remains, as of 2010, the club's lowest finishing position. Santos became the first club in the world to win the continental treble during the 1962 season consisting of the Paulista, Taça Brasil, and the Copa Libertadores. In 1955, Lula was appointed manager and assembled what would later be known as the Os Santásticos. In 1961 he led the club to its first league title and repeated the feat the following four seasons when the club also won the Copa Libertadores for the first time and successfully defended the trophy once.

Santos has employed several famous players, with eleven FIFA World Cup, six Copa América and one FIFA Confederations Cup winners among the previous and current Santos players. Arnaldo Patusca was the first Santista player to participate with the national team during the 1916 Copa América. Araken Patusca was the first player from the club to participate with Brazil at a World Cup in 1930. The first Peixe to participate with the national team at the Confederations Cup was Léo at the 2001 FIFA Confederations Cup.

Pelé was voted South American footballer of the year in 1973, won the FIFA World Cup Best Young Player award in 1958 and FIFA World Cup Golden Ball in 1970. Pepe is considered one of the greatest wingers of all time and the player who won the most Brasileirãos with seven titles in total. He has also won the most Campeonato Paulistas with 13 titles in total and the only player to spend his entire player career with Santos. Coutinho, considered one of the greatest forwards in the sport, was the top scorer during Santos' victorious campaign during the 1962 Copa Libertadores and scored Santos' 5000th goal in a 10–2 rout of Guarani in 1961.

Key

List of players

Notes
<div style="font-size: 100%;">
NB For a full description of positions see football positions.

See also
 Santos FC and the Brazil national football team

References

Further reading

Filmography 

 Aníbal Massaini Neto, Pelé Eterno, 2004.
 Carlos Hugo Christensen, O Rei Pelé, 1963.
 Djalma Limongi Batista, Asa Branca: um sonho brasileiro, 1981.
 Eduardo Escorel and Luiz Carlos Barreto, Isto é Pelé, 1974.
 Felipe Nepomuceno, Guadalajara 70, 2002.
 Hank Levine, Marcelo Machado and Tocha Alves, Ginga, 2004.
 Mercado Livre, Santos, Especial, 2011.
 Paulo Machline, Uma história de futebol, 1998.
 Pedro Asbeg, Dogão calabresa, 2002.
 Ugo Giorgetti, Boleiros, 1998.

External links
 
Santos Idols Gallery 

Santos FC
 
 
Association football player non-biographical articles